Rome–Fiumicino International Airport "Leonardo da Vinci", commonly known as Leonardo da Vinci–Fiumicino Airport, is an international airport in Fiumicino, Italy, serving Rome. It is the busiest airport in the country, the 10th busiest airport in Europe and the world's 49th-busiest airport with over 29,3 million passengers served in 2022.

Together with Ciampino Airport, it forms the Rome airport system with 32.8 million passengers in 2022, the second airport system in Italy by number of passengers.

The airport is Hub of ITA together with the airport of Milan Linate, formerly the flag carrier and largest Italian airline.

As of 2022, it has won the “Best Airport Award” in the category of hubs with over 40 million passengers, issued by Airports Council International (ACI) Europe, for three years in a row.

History

Early years
During construction the remains of Caligula's Giant Ship were found.

The airport was officially opened on 15 January 1961, with two runways, replacing the smaller Rome Ciampino Airport, which remains in service for some low-cost airlines as well as domestic and charter operations.  Despite being officially opened in 1961, Leonardo da Vinci–Fiumicino Airport had actually been in use since 20 August 1960.  This was to help relieve air traffic that was congesting Rome Ciampino Airport during the 1960 Summer Olympics.

During the 1960s, former home-based Alitalia invested heavily in the new airport, building hangars and maintenance centres; in the same period a third runway was added (16L/34R).

Later development
Security Services transferred from the Polizia di Stato (Italian State Police) to Aeroporti di Roma S.p.A. in 2000. Aeroporti di Roma created ADR Security S.r.l. (100%-owned) to provide these services as well as security services to airlines (in competition with other security companies such as IVRI).  Airport Security is supervised by Polizia di Stato, Guardia di Finanza (Italian Customs Police), Italian Civil Aviation Authority and Aeroporti di Roma S.p.A.. Ground handling services were provided by Aeroporti di Roma until 1999, when it created Aeroporti di Roma Handling (to serve all airlines except for Alitalia, which continued to be handled by Aeroporti di Roma itself). Alitalia provided passenger assistance even before 1999. In 2001, Alitalia created "Alitalia Airport" and started providing ground handling for itself and other airlines. Aeroporti di Roma Handling remains the biggest handler in terms of airlines handled, but Alitalia Airport is the biggest handler in terms of airplanes handled as Alitalia aircraft account for 50% of the ones at Fiumicino. In May 2006, Italy's Civil Aviation Authority announced that it took off the limitation of 3 ramp handlers in Rome Leonardo da Vinci airport. ARE Group and Aviapartner announced that they would create a company called Aviapartner (51% Aviapartner; 49% ARE Group) to serve Milan Malpensa and Rome Leonardo da Vinci.

Since 2005, the airport operates a category III B instrument landing system (ILS). Further improvement work was implemented in 2007 to enable the airport to handle 30 takeoffs/landings per hour, up from 10, in the event of thick fog. Three runways presently operate at Leonardo da Vinci airport: 16L/34R and 16R/34L (separated by a distance of ), and 07/25, used only westwards for takeoffs owing to the prevailing winds. The airport used to have a fourth runway, 16C/34C which was located alongside 16L/34R, it was mostly used as a taxiway or as a backup for 16L/34R; the runway is now designated as Taxiway "D".

In 2010, the new single baggage handling system for more efficient luggage delivery began operations.

Several projects are planned. These include the construction of an environmentally-friendly cogeneration system, which would allow the airport to produce its own energy; the "Masterplan Fiumicino Nord", involving four new terminals and two new runways to be built in the future handling 100 million passengers per year.

Terminals

Overview
As of 2021, after major expansion and refurbishment works, the airport now features two reorganised passenger terminals, one of which is currently operational.

Terminal 1 (Gates A1–A83) has been closed for renovations with many gates currently unused, its main pier is currently being expanded with a second one next to it.
Terminal 3 (Gates E1–E52) is the largest terminal which serves as the home base for ITA Airways amongst several other airlines. It also incorporates the former Terminal 5 as well as the satellite building for non-Schengen departures. A new central airside hall has been built as its middle part in recent years.

Development

The terminals were upgraded during the 1990s and 2000s. In 1991, the domestic Pier A with 12 gates opened, followed in 1995 by the international Pier B with 10 gates and in 1999 by the international Satellite C with 14 gates. In 2000, the new domestic Terminal A opened, and the terminal buildings, then consisting of Terminal A (with Pier A), Terminal AA, Terminal B (with Pier B) and Terminal C (with Satellite C), were reorganized.

The dedicated Cargo City terminal was added in 2004, while the check-in counters for Northwest Airlines, Delta Air Lines, Continental Airlines, United Airlines, US Airways, American Airlines and El Al in Terminal 5 opened in 2008, with passengers then being bused to what was then called Satellite C. In 2009, the terminals were renamed – A was renamed T1, AA was renamed T2, B and C became T3, and T5 stayed the same.

In January 2017, Terminal 5 was closed for renovations; a new central airside hall is currently being built in the middle section.

The former Terminal 2 closed permanently on 15 December 2017 to make way for the north-west expansion of Terminal 1.  A new three-storey boarding and waiting area, as well as a new Pier A with 13 boarding and 10 remote gates, are currently being constructed alongside Terminal 1, to open in Summer 2022.

From 17 March 2020 to 6 August 2021, Terminal 1 has been closed due to decreased passenger traffic amidst the COVID-19 pandemic; this pause was used to perform a redesign of the main hall layout, which increased the available passenger space.

Future plans include a new Terminal 4, expansion of runways, and new buildings for car parking, services, and airport facilities.

SkyBridge
An automated people mover (APM) called SkyBridge opened in 1999 along with the Satellite C. It consists of two stations, one in the third floor of Terminal 3, and the other in the second floor of gate area E31–44. This shuttle train is the only means of transport for passengers between the two parts of the terminal. The westbound service, from T3 to Gates E31–44, is for departing passengers only, while the eastbound service is for arriving passengers only. Arriving passengers are not permitted to take the train back, as they need to pass through a transfer security checkpoint to reenter the departure area. Likewise, departing passengers are not permitted to take the train back to Terminal 3.

Airlines and destinations
The following airlines operate regular scheduled, seasonal and charter flights to and from Fiumicino:

Statistics

Graph

Busiest domestic routes

Busiest European routes

Busiest intercontinental routes

Ground transportation

Train
Fiumicino Aeroporto railway station is served by the Leonardo Express train operated by Trenitalia, available at the airport terminal. It takes 30 minutes to get to Termini Station in a non-stop trip that is provided every 15 minutes. Alternatively, local trains (FL1 line) leave once every 15 minutes, stopping at all stations. However, these trains do not head to Termini station. Passengers have to change at Trastevere, Ostiense (Metro Piramide) or Tuscolana. The railway opened in December 1989, with non-stop and several stopping services available.

Road
The airport is served by the six-lane Autostrada A91 motorway and numerous buses and taxis.

Incidents and accidents
From the 1960s until the 1980s, the airport experienced significant aircraft hijackings as well as being the scene of two major terrorist attacks and the port of origin for an aircraft bombing in flight—some engendered by Palestinians as part of the Israeli–Palestinian conflict.

On 23 November 1964, TWA Flight 800, operated by a Boeing 707, had an engine catch fire during takeoff. 50 of the 73 passengers and crew on board were killed.
On 17 December 1973, during the 1973 Rome airport attacks and hijacking, a Boeing 707-321B operating as Pan American World Airways (Pan Am) Flight 110 was attacked by Palestinian assailants. 30 passengers were killed when phosphorus bombs were thrown aboard the aircraft as it was preparing for departure. During the same incident a Lufthansa Boeing 737  was hijacked and landed at Athens, Damascus and finally in Kuwait. All remaining passengers and crew were then released. Two people died in the incident.
In January 1973, a number of extremists planned to attack Prime Minister Golda Meir's plane at Fiumicino airport. They placed Strela missiles inside a number of vehicles at certain locations around the airport, but Italian and Israeli authorities were able to intercept them.
On 19 November 1977, an Ethiopian Airlines Boeing 707-360C, a cargo flight, crashed after takeoff 0.5 km (0.3 m) W of FCO. The plane barely gained height after takeoff from runway 25, reaching a height of 7–8 meters, contacting treetops, and struck the ground 280 meters further on. All 5 occupants (3 crew, 2 passengers) were killed. Unconfirmed reports indicated the plane was overloaded.
On 27 December 1985, during the Rome and Vienna airport attacks, assailants shot and killed 16 people and wounded 99 others at the check-in counter. Most perpetrators were shot by security and police officers.
On 17 October 1988, Uganda Airlines Flight 775 from London Gatwick to Entebbe International Airport via Fiumicino, crashed short of the runway after two missed approaches. Twenty-six of the 45 passengers aboard, as well as all 7 crew members, died.
On 2 February 2013, Alitalia Flight 1670, operated by a leased ATR 72, en route from Pisa International Airport to Rome, overran the runway during landing. Sixteen occupants were injured, two of them seriously. The aircraft was subsequently written off.
On 8 June 2013, Wizz Air Flight 3141, an Airbus A320-232 (registration HA-LWM) from Bucharest – Henri Coandă Airport, Romania to Rome-Ciampino, Italy, made an emergency landing at Fiumicino Airport when the crew encountered problems lowering one of the main undercarriages and locking it into position. The aircraft diverted to Fiumicino because of the longer runway, and firefighters applied foam after landing as a precautionary measure. The aircraft was evacuated using slides. Initial reports of injured passengers were denied by both Wizz Air and Rome Fiumicino Airport, who said some passengers requested medical checkups but reported no injuries.
On 29 September 2013 at 20:10, an Alitalia Airbus A320 flying from Madrid Barajas Airport to Rome Fiumicino Airport failed to deploy the landing gear during a storm on landing and the aircraft toppled, skidded off the runway, and crashed. Ten passengers suffered minor injuries, and all 151 passengers and crew were evacuated and taken to hospital.

References

External links

Airports in Rome
Fiumicino
Buildings and structures in Lazio
Buildings and structures in the Metropolitan City of Rome Capital
Airports established in 1961
1961 establishments in Italy